Hampton Park Terrace is the name both of a neighborhood and a National Register district located in peninsular Charleston, South Carolina.  The neighborhood is bounded on the west by The Citadel, on the north by Hampton Park, on the east by Rutledge Ave., and on the south by Congress St. In addition, the one block of Parkwood Ave. south of Congress St. is considered, by some, to be included. The National Register district, on the other hand, is composed of the same area with two exceptions: (1) the northeasternmost block is excluded and (2) an extra block of President St. is included.

History
The land upon which the neighborhood is built was rural land until approximately 1900.  At about that time, a few streets began being laid out in the northern end of the city.  A few small houses were constructed at that time, but most of the land remained undeveloped.  In 1912, three large sections of the neighborhood were platted.  Those sections roughly correspond to the northwest quadrant, the southwest quadrant, and the southeast quadrant. They were developed by, respectively, the Charleston Building & Investment Co., Hampton Park Terrace Inc., and the Allan family. The final quadrant to the northeast was sporadically developed through the 1930s by the Navy Yard Building & Investment Co.

The neighborhood was, at the time, on the very edge of developed Charleston.  At first, skeptics claimed that the development would fail, but within a month of the start of selling lots, more than 100 of the 251 original lots had been sold. The development was amid truck farming sites, but it benefitted from its location near the Ashley River and Hampton Park.  A newspaper account at the time predicted that its success would start a move to suburban living in Charleston instead of in the lower peninsula because of these advantages: "No more desirable location for a home could be imagined-close to the river, away from the noise and bustle of the city, on the Rutledge avenue [trolley] car line and close to the King street car line, bordering Hampton Park, beautiful now and to be doubly beautiful when plans now being worked out are completed, within sight of the Ashley River with its fresh salt breezes, and the whole area high and dry, sixteen feet above low water mark, within four blocks of the Mitchell School, the biggest and best of the schools of the city system."

The residents of Hampton Park Terrace celebrated the neighborhood's 100th anniversary in March 2012. The event included a performance by The Citadel's Regimental Band and Pipes and the unveiling of a state historical marker.

National Register Status
Most of the housing in the neighborhood was constructed between 1912 and 1925.  The architecture of the neighborhood follows national trends of the period and represents a distinct break from the local tradition of Charleston's other historic areas.  Nevertheless, because of its largely intact concentration of early 20th century buildings, the neighborhood (other than the northeasternmost portion) was added to the National Register on September 26, 1997. The National Register designation included those blocks that were laid out and whose restrictive covenants were created by one of four related development companies. As a result, the northeast corner of Hampton Park Terrace was not included in the historic district although it is part of the neighborhood.

Since the designation, several houses have been restored including one which was given a special award by the Historic Charleston Foundation for the quality of the work at 463 Huger St. In 2009, the Preservation Society of Charleston held its first outreach tour of historic houses and highlighted Hampton Park Terrace.

Gallery of Hampton Park Terrace houses

The Hampton Park Terrace National Register district includes historic structures on the following streets:

Ashley Ave. (north of Congress St. to Huger St.)
Congress St. (west of Rutledge Ave. to President St. (north side) and west of President St. (both sides))
Elmwood Ave. (all)
Glenwood Ave. (all)
Hagood Ave. (north of Congress St. to Moultrie St. (east side))
Huger St. (west of Rutledge Ave. to Ashley Ave. (south side) and west of Ashley Ave. (both sides))
Kenilworth Ave. (all)
Moultrie St. (west of Ashley Ave.)
North Allan Park (all)
Parkwood Ave. (all)
President St. (north of Sumter St. to Congress St. (west side) and north of Congress St. (both sides))
Rutledge Ave. (north of Congress St. to Huger St. (west side))
South Allan Park (all)
Sumter St. (west of President St. (north side))
Sutherland Ave. (all)
Sutherland Ct. (all)
Wesson Ave. (all)

Unless otherwise indicated, the following table shows images of all of the buildings in the district (contributing and non-contributing) in their current condition; the current images do not necessarily reflect the appearance and condition of the structures at the time the National Register district was formed.

References

Houses on the National Register of Historic Places in South Carolina
Neighborhoods in Charleston, South Carolina
Historic districts on the National Register of Historic Places in South Carolina
National Register of Historic Places in Charleston, South Carolina
Houses in Charleston, South Carolina